Maiestas parapruthii (formerly Recilia parapruthii) is a species of bug from the Cicadellidae family that is endemic to India.

The species was moved from Recilia to Maiestas in 2009.

References

Endemic fauna of India
Hemiptera of Asia
Insects described in 2005
Insects of India
Maiestas